Mooers may refer to:

People
 Benjamin Mooers (1758–1838), American general from the American Revolution and New York state legislator
 Calvin Mooers (1919–1994), American computer scientist known for his work in information retrieval and for the programming language TRAC

Places
 Mooers, New York, a town named after Benjamin Mooers
 Mooers (CDP), New York, a  hamlet and census-designated place in the town